In basketball, a free throw is an unopposed attempt to score points from behind the free throw line. The Liga ACB's (Endesa) free throw percentage leader is the player with the highest free throw percentage in a given season.

To qualify as a leader for the free throw percentage, a player must play in at least 75 percent of the total number of possible games, and must make at least 40 free throws the entire season.

Free throw Percentage leaders

Notes

References

Basketball in Spain
Liga ACB